Neocollyris chloroptera is a species of ground beetle in the genus Neocollyris in the family Carabidae. It was described by Chaudoir in 1860.

References

Chloroptera, Neocollyris
Beetles described in 1860